Estadio Gabino Sosa is a multi-use stadium in Rosario, Argentina.  It is currently used mostly for football matches and is the home stadium of Club Atlético Central Córdoba.  The stadium holds 17,000 people.

It is named after the former Central Córdoba and Argentina player Gabino Sosa.

External links
Stadium information 

Gabino
Central Córdoba de Rosario